San Nicolás Tolentino is a municipality and town located in central San Luis Potosí, Mexico. The municipality was founded in 1614, and consists of many small towns and villages. Santa Catarina is the largest town in the municipality. In 1827, the Municipal Presidency was established in the town.

Geography
The municipality of San Nicolás Tolentino is located in the "Middle Zone" (Zona Media) of the state of San Luis Potosí, in the Sierra Madre Oriental. The land consists of high plains and mountains.

It is bordered to the northwest by the municipality of Armadillo de los Infante; to the north by the municipality of Cerritos; to the northeast by the municipality of Villa Juárez; to the east by the municipality of Rioverde; to the southeast by the municipality of Ciudad Fernández; and to the southwest by the municipality of Zaragoza.

Settlements
Settlements in the municipality, in addition to the town of San Nicolás Tolentino, include: Santa Catarina, Ocampo, Ignacio Allende, La laguna, Potrero de santa gertrudis, Las Golondrinas, El Carrizal de Guadalupe, Los Nogales, Cañas, Jaguey de san francisco,La presa, Ojo de Agua, San Jose de Nogalitos, Agua Zarca, San Martin de Abajo, San Martin de Arriba, Los Morenos, Barranca de san Joaquin, El pinal, la Ballita

Geology
The surface rocks consist mainly of Cretaceous sedimentary limestones, conglomerates, and sandy- limey- shales.  There is some interbedded gypsum. These Cretaceous rocks are overlain in places by Neogene and Quaternary alluvial sediments with some volcanics. There is a mercury mine in the municipality.

Demographics
There are fifty-five settlements in the municipality. As of 2009, the population was 5,547.

Economy
Agriculture makes up most of San Nicolás Tolentino's economy.

Tourist places
Rancho las Guacamayas
On the road Ojo de Agua, San Martin de Abajo Km 7, San Nicolas Tolentino, San Luis Potosi, Mexico is the rancho las guacamayas, its mission is to be a world-renowned eco-tourism option that offers visitors a unique experience in ecotourism , focused mainly on the sighting of a flock of free macaws in their natural state, as well as the other fauna of birds and mammals present in the area. Positively impacting the habitat in which we find ourselves and the neighboring communities, thus promoting ecological awareness.
Rancho las Guacamayas has an area of 700 hectares. In 1984, the Family bought Rancho Las Guacamayas with the dream of protecting the fauna and promoting repopulation in that space of Nature. http://rancholasguacamayas.com/

Luxury Eco Camping
Located an hour and a half from the city of San Luis Potosí, in the Sierra of the municipality of San Nicolás Tolentino, is Fisterra, Luxury Eco Camping, which seems to be the last corner of the Earth, since beyond... there is only Heaven .
Fisterra, Luxury Eco Camping
It gives those who visit it tranquility, comfort and luxury, as well as unforgettable landscapes and most importantly, a mystical and starry sky that makes your stay a unique and unforgettable experience.
Staying in Fisterra will allow you to rest from life in the city, enjoy nature, the forest and the stars with your partner or friends, without neglecting the comforts and luxuries of the best hotel you have ever stayed at. https://fisterraglamping.com/experiencia-natural/

presa las golondrinas
Las Golondrinas Dam, which is also located in the municipality of San Nicolas Tolentino. Getting there takes two hours from the state capital and an hour and a half from the city of Rioverde, since it is located on federal highway 70, at the junction with the communities called El Cañón, belonging to Ciudad Fernández, on a road that connects that municipality with San Nicolás Tolentino, Villa Juárez, Cerritos and that even connects with federal highway 57 on an adventure route as the slogan dictates.
Hiking is one of the activities that, in addition to promoting health, offers low-cost adventures and provides satisfaction for any traveler who wants to get to know San Luis Potosí.

An example of these adventures is the Las Golondrinas dam in the municipality of San Nicolás Tolentino, an immense body of water that just by looking at it, your blood freezes due to its depth, its contrast of colors and its wealth of fauna. ideal for country tourism.

The founding of the town of San Nicolás Tolentino was around the year 1600 by Chichimeca Indians and its first historical record is from 1673 when the creation of its church is attested.

The Las Golondrinas dam was born in the 1970s and was inaugurated by the then President of the Republic, José López Portillo, at that time responding to the need to improve agriculture and water collection.

In the first instance, it gave a lot of work to dozens of residents of nearby communities such as Laguna de Santo Domingo, Ocampo, El Sermón, who took five years to build the 120-meter depth -one of the deepest in the state-, which is why which despite the droughts, is never without water.

The dam was originally built at Ranchito El Muerto, but the settlers were soon absorbed by the larger nearby communities such as Laguna de Santo Domingo and Las Golondrinas, the name the site eventually took.

Municipal Presidents
 Doroteo Gómez Maldonado - 1949-1952
 Onesimo Saldaña Ipiña - 1952-1955
 José Crecencio Cárdenas Hernández - 1955-1958
 Sulpicio Alvarez Torres - 1958 - 1961
 Bernardo Esquivel Hernández - 1961 - 1964
 Alejendrino Ruiz Ruiz - 1964 - 1967
 José Crecencio Cárdenas Hernández - 1967 - 1970
 Teófilo Flores Torres - 1970 - 1973
 Antonio Vázquez Ruiz y Abdon Nieto Torres - 1973 - 1976
 José Gustavo Ruiz Pesina - 1976 - 1979
 Apolonio Leal Ruiz - 1979 - 1982
 José Gustavo Ruiz Pesina - 1982 - 1985
 Luis Juárez Rosas - 1985 - 1988
 Arnulfo Alvarez Rodríguez - 1988 - 1991
 Sulpicio Arriaga Hernández - 1991 - 1994
 Petra Martínez Avalos - 1994 - 1997
 José Castillo Sifuentes - 1997 - 2000
 Abelardo Saldaña Vargas - 2000 - 2003
 José Asunción Pérez Nava - 2003 - 2006
 Antonio González Maya - 2006 - 2009
 Pedro Infante Rodríguez - 2009 - 2012
 Olga Ruiz Vazquez - 2012 - 2015
 Pedro Infante Rodriguez - 2015 - 2018
 Pedro Infante Rodriguez - 2018 - 2021
 Arturo Elias Rodriguez - 2021 - 2024

Notes and references

Populated places in San Luis Potosí
1614 establishments in New Spain